Achrastenus is a genus of broad-nosed weevils in the beetle family Curculionidae. There is at least one described species in Achrastenus, A. griseus.

References

Further reading

 
 
 
 

Entiminae
Articles created by Qbugbot